is a Japanese actor who had several lead roles, most prominently as the protagonist Shinji Kido in Kamen Rider Ryuki.

Filmography

Film
 Kamen Rider Ryuki: Episode Final (2002) as Shinji Kido/Kamen Rider Ryuki; Mirror Shinji/Kamen Rider Ryuga
 Mail (2004) as Reiji Akiba
Waters (2005) as Yuki
 Cromartie High - The Movie (Sakigake!! Cromartie Koukou) as Takashi Kamiyama
 Death Trance 
 Love My Life as Akira
 TAJOMARU (2009) as Taka
 HE-LOW (2018) as Hiroshi Motooka
 Kamen Rider Heisei Generations Forever (2018) as Kamen Rider Ryuki (voice)
 HE-LOW THE SECOND (2019) as Hiroshi Motooka/Slider Kamen Dragon Knight
 Genin: Blue Shadow (2019) as Takamasa
 Howling Village (2020) as Keisuke
 HE-LOW THE FINAL (2022) as Hiroshi Motooka/Slider Kamen Dragon Knight
 Kamen Rider Geats × Revice: Movie Battle Royale (2022) as Shinji Kido/Kamen Rider Ryuki; Mirror Shinji/Kamen Rider Ryuga

Television
 Kamen Rider Ryuki (2002) as Shinji Kido/Kamen Rider Ryuki
 Kamen Rider Ryuki Special: 13 Riders (2002) as Shinji Kido/Kamen Rider Ryuki; Kamen Rider Ryuga
 Sh15uya (2005)
 Tenchijin (2009) as Ukita Hideie 
 Fashion Story: Model (2012)
 Yae no Sakura (2013), Kusaka Genzui
 Gunshi Kanbei (2014), Tatsuzō
 Hana Moyu (2015), Murakami Tsunehisa
 Massan (2015), Shingo Yamamura
 Kamen Rider Zi-O (2019) as Shinji Kido; Mirror Shinji/Another Ryuga
 Kamen Rider Zi-O Spin-off - Rider Time: Kamen Rider Ryuki (2019) as Shinji Kido/Kamen Rider Ryuki; Mirror Shinji/Kamen Rider Ryuga
 Kirin ga Kuru (2020) as Saitō Toshimitsu

Japanese dub
 Minority Report'' as Chief John Anderton (Tom Cruise)

References

External links
 (in Japanese)

1977 births
Living people
Male actors from Tokyo
Kamen Rider